Bodyguard is the third studio album by American rock duo The I.L.Y's. The album was released by Castle Face Records on May 16, 2017. It was the band's first album to be released on Castle Face, after two self-released albums, and their first to be pressed on CD and vinyl.

Background
The album was initially announced along with its track-listing and artwork on March 25, 2017. The band later shared a double music video on YouTube for "Gargoyle" and "Bobo". Audio for "I Love You Man" was released on SoundCloud on May 2. The album was released for streaming through iTunes, YouTube and SoundCloud on May 16, with CD and vinyl releases scheduled for June 16.

Release and reception
Stereogum awarded the album the website's "Album of the Week" accolade.

Track listing

Personnel
The I.L.Y's
 Zach Hill – vocals, drums, keyboards, guitar, production
 Andy Morin – guitar, bass, engineering

Additional musicians
 Tristan Tozer – guitar (1)

References

External links

2017 albums
The I.L.Y's albums